Cynometra falcata is a species of plant in the family Fabaceae. It is found only in Fiji.

References

falcata
Endemic flora of Fiji
Taxonomy articles created by Polbot